The 2021 Los Angeles Valiant season was the fourth season of Los Angeles Valiant's existence in the Overwatch League.

Preceding offseason

Roster changes 
The Valiant entered free agency with three free agents, two of which became free agents due to the Valiant not exercising the option to retain the player for another year.

Acquisitions 
The Valiant's first acquisition of the offseason was Adam "Adam" Soong, a rookie tank player coming from Overwatch Contenders Australia team Ground Zero Gaming who signed on November 19, 2020. On December 9, they signed Brady "Agilities" Girardi, a veteran damage player who had played for the Valiant in 2018 and 2019 before signing with the Toronto Defiant in 2020.

After releasing the entirety of their roster and staff in preparation for their move to China for the 2021 season, the Valiant announced their new roster on March 18, 2021. For their damage players, they signed Liao "Molanran" Yang, a "highly touted prospect" from Contenders, and Cai "Krystal" Shilong, a controversial player who had been forcibly removed from his prior two Overwatch League teams. Their tank signings consisted of Han "Sliver3" Haibo, Wen "NvM" Yelin, who had been retired for over three years, and Cheng "ShowCheng" Yu. For their support players, the Valiant signed Zhang "Highbee" Zening and Qi "" Haomiao, another "highly touted prospect" at points in his career.

Departures 
None of the Spark's three free agents returned, two of which signed with other teams, beginning with damage player Damon "Apply" Conti, who signed with Overwatch Contenders team Revival on December 9, 2020. On February 1, 2021, tank player Rick "Gig" Salazar signed with Contenders team We Want OWL. The team's final free agent damage player Caleb "McGravy" McGarvey announced his retirement in the offseason.

Outside of free agency, the Valiant's first departure was damage player Kyle "KSF" Frandanisa, who was transferred to the Houston Outlaws on December 7. On February 2, 2021, the Valiant released all of its players and staff, citing visa issues, as they prepared compete from China instead of North America for the 2021 season. Players released included damage players Brady "Agilities" Girardi, Kai "Kai" Collins, and Johannes "Shax" Nielsen; tank players Adam "Adam" Soong and Song "Dreamer" Sang-lok; and support players Mun "Lastro" Jung-won and Park "Rain" Jae-ho.

Regular season

May Melee 
The Valiant began their 2021 season on April 17 with a loss to the Chengdu Hunters 1–3 in the May Melee qualifiers. They were swept in their following match against the Philadelphia Fusion 0–3.

Final roster

Standings

Game log

Regular season 

|2021 season schedule

References 

Los Angeles Valiant
Los Angeles Valiant
Los Angeles Valiant seasons